The 2023 F4 Japanese Championship season will be the ninth season of the F4 Japanese Championship. It will be competed with 14 races over seven double-header rounds.

Teams and drivers
All teams are Japanese-registered.

Race calendar and results 
All rounds will be held in Japan and will support the Super GT events.

Notes

References

External links 

  

Japanese F4 Championship seasons
Japanese F4
F4 Japanese Championship
Japanese F4